Lluís Guillermo Mas Bonet (born 15 January 1989) is a Spanish racing cyclist, who currently rides for UCI WorldTeam .

He rode in the Vuelta a España every year from 2014 to 2018. On 3 May 2015, he won the final stage of the Tour of Turkey; he attacked the peloton on a cobbled section a few kilometers from the line, and won just ahead of Mark Cavendish. In May 2019, he was named in the startlist for the 2019 Giro d'Italia.

Major results

2004
 2nd Time trial, National Novice Road Championships
2007
 1st Overall Vuelta a les Comarces de Castello
1st Stage 2a
 1st Trofeo Fernando Escartin
 1st Campo de Criptana
 2nd Overall Vuelta Ciclista Vegas de Granada
1st Stage 3a
 6th Time trial, UCI Juniors World Championships
2009
 10th Time trial, Mediterranean Games
2011
 7th Time trial, UCI Under-23 Road World Championships
2013
 1st Festes Agost Campos
 1st  Mountains classification, Vuelta a Castilla y León
 1st Stage 3 Pla de Mallorca
 2nd  Time trial, Mediterranean Games
 2nd Overall Volta às Terras de Santa Maria Feira
1st Stage 2
 2nd Trofeu Festes de Sant Bartomeu
 2nd Festes Maria Salut
 4th Overall Tour of China I
 9th Overall Tour de Bretagne
2014
 1st  Sprints classification, Vuelta a Burgos
 6th Overall Tour d'Azerbaïdjan
 Vuelta a España
Held  after Stages 3–13
Held  after Stage 3
 Combativity award Stages 3 & 9
2015
 Tour of Turkey
1st  Sprints classification
1st Stage 8
 1st  Sprints classification, Volta a Catalunya
2016
 4th Overall Presidential Tour of Turkey
1st  Sprints classification
2017
 1st  Sprints classification, Tour of the Basque Country
 1st  Mountains classification, Boucles de la Mayenne
2018
 1st  Mountains classification, Vuelta a Andalucía
  Combativity award Stage 9 Vuelta a España
2019
 4th Time trial, National Road Championships

Grand Tour general classification results timeline

References

External links
 

1989 births
Living people
Spanish male cyclists
Sportspeople from Mallorca
Mediterranean Games silver medalists for Spain
Mediterranean Games medalists in cycling
European Games competitors for Spain
Cyclists at the 2015 European Games
Competitors at the 2009 Mediterranean Games
Competitors at the 2013 Mediterranean Games
Cyclists from the Balearic Islands